Nomad is the second full-length studio album by American metalcore band Chasing Safety. The album was released through Outerloop Records on January 6, 2017. This album is the first album to feature guitar player Patrick Hall after former lead and rhythm guitarist Steve Novoa and Derek Williams left the band in 2016. Scheduled to be released summer 2016, the release got delayed because of the line-up change.

Release and promotion 
The band premiered the first single "Brand New Prison" on October 20, 2016. On November 17, 2016, Chasing Safety released the title track and second single to their new album, "This Is Hell", accompanied with a music video. The band later compromised "Erase Me" on December 8 and then "Long for More" on December 20, 2016.

Track listing

Personnel 

Chasing Safety
Johnny Galivan – lead vocals
Kenny Davis – bass guitar, clean vocals
Patrick Hall – rhythm guitar, lead guitar
Luke Genocide – drums

Additional
Kile Odell – producer, engineer
Curtis Martin – producer, engineer, writer

References 

2017 albums
Metalcore albums by American artists